Events in the year 1912 in India.

Incumbents
 Emperor of India – George V
 Viceroy of India – Charles Hardinge, 1st Baron Hardinge of Penshurst

Events
 National income - 12,869 million
 On April 20, Baranagore Ramakrishna Mission Ashrama High School, a senior secondary boys' school was founded at Baranagar, Kolkata, West Bengal.
 On February 14, George V gave a speech in the British Parliament about his visit to the imperial colonies and expressed his trust to India people and government he saw during his visit to India in 1911.
 On December 18–21, the India National (Missionary) Conference convened in Calcutta. One of its principal conclusions recognized the need for good Christian literature in India. To decide this question the Conference established a committee which by 1914 proposed three series of books aimed at embracing Christian principles.
 On December 29, India obtained its first Anglican bishop. Vedanayakam Samuel Azariah (1874–1945), the son of an Indian clergyman, educated at Madras Christian College, was consecrated as the First Indian Anglican bishop in St. Paul's Cathedral, Calcutta. There were present 11 British Anglican bishops, and the Governor of Bengal. In ten days Azariah took office in the newly created diocese of Dornakal.
 The construction of New Delhi was started. It was decided in 1911 when George V visited India during his travels to the British Empire colonies. The British Viceroy made Sir Edwin Lutyens responsible for the overall plan of Delhi and in 1912 he visited New Delhi to start his work. But the construction itself began only after World War I. Currently New Delhi is considered to be the crowning glory of the British Raj.
 Muslim Indian doctors and nurses were sent to join the Red Crescent organization to provide medical aid for Turkish troops in the Balkan war.
 Bihar and Orissa provinces were carved out as a separate province from the British Raj.

Law
 June – the Government of India Bill is passed by which the seat of government is moved from Calcutta to Delhi and changes in the constitution of Bengal and Assam are made
 India introduced registration of motor vehicles.
 Wild Birds and Animals Protection Act
Indian Lunacy Act

Publications
In March, Lala Har Dayal wrote an article for Modern Review entitled "Marx: A Modern Rishi", which is believed to be the first Indian article on Marx.
Swadeshabhimani Ramakrishna Pillai wrote the biography of Karl Marx (1912) in Malayalam, which was the first Marx biography in any Indian language.

Births
27 February – Lawrence Durrell, novelist, poet, dramatist and travel writer  – (died 1990 in France).
3 July – Hans Raj Khanna, Supreme Court Judge (died 2008).
10 September – B. D. Jatti, former Indian president(acting) (died 2002).
15 September – Russi Karanjia, journalist and editor (died 2008).
25 October – Madurai Mani Iyer, Carnatic music singer (died 1968).
 Abdul Hafeez or 'Hafeez Hoshiarpuri', Urdu poet born in Hoshiarpur, Punjab. (died 1973 in Karachi, Pakistan).
 Shankara Ram. M.Varadarajan, Tamil novelist. (died 1974).

Deaths
 Hafeez Jaunpuri (real name Haafiz Muhammad Ali), poet, born in 1865 in Jaunpur.
 Rev. Thomas Walker, Indian chief spokesperson of Keswick Convention.
 Theodore L. Pennell, a medical missionary in India, born in 1867.

References

 
India
Years of the 20th century in India